İskenderun attack may refer to one of the following:

 2010 İskenderun attack
 2020 İskenderun shootout